The economic impact of immigration is an important topic in Canada. Two conflicting narratives exist: 1) higher immigration levels help to increase economy (GDP)  and 2) higher immigration levels decreases GDP per capita or living standards for the resident population and leads to diseconomies of scale in terms of overcrowding of hospitals, schools and recreational facilities, deteriorating environment, increase in cost of services, increase in cost of housing, etc. A commonly supported argument is that impact on GDP is not an effective metric for immigration. Another narrative for immigration is replacement of the ageing workforce. However, economists note that increasing immigration rates is not an effective strategy to counter this entirely. Policy Options found that mass immigration has a null effect on GDP. Increased immigration numbers and the associated soaring housing prices has significantly contributed to the rise of inflation in 2021 to the highest in 18 years.

Canada is one of the top western countries that accepts most immigrants per capita and was ranking 9th in 2015 in terms of immigrants as a percent of the population among western countries while Liechtenstein ranked first. The per capita immigration rate to Canada has been relatively constant since the 1950s, and in the first and second decades of 21st century there was a steady increase in the education and skill level of immigrants to Canada due to the focus on higher average productivity based applicants and thus immigrants to Canada on average were better educated than Canadians. This trend was enhanced for income redistribution in the third decade of the 21st century by opening low-skilled immigrant pathways that only required minimal scores for immigration to achieve target of 400,000 immigrants per year. From 2022 onward, Trudeau government has set aggressive immigration targets per Century Initiative's lobbying, in 2023 it was 465,000, 485,000 in 2024, and it is 500,000 in 2025. 

An article by an ex-policy maker states that Canada is rooting for the low-wage-low-productivity model of competitiveness that it has been locked in from the mid-1980s with this move. The article further observes that it is imperative that Canada and the "government for the people" require a fundamental re-commitment to pre-1970s dominating national objective and efforts for a steady improvement in raising the living standard of Canadians by embracing the supply and demand concept of labour economics, and improving the economic efficiency of the system. A former director from Quebec's Ministry of Immigration observed that the aggressive target-based mass immigration policy is out of control, without an open consultation, and that the government needs to treat people better.

Overview

Immigration to Canada

According to the CIA's World Factbook (2017), Canada has one of the highest migration rates in the world. Canada is also unusual among western nations in the widespread popular support for high rates of immigration, and a 2007 study showed support for immigration has increased in Canada. In 2014, all of Canada's major political parties support either sustaining or increasing the current level of immigration.

Economic rationale for immigration

There is no agreed view on the net impact of immigration in current times. Historically, Canada's unusually high immigration rates can be traced to the nation's unique economy. Another factor, is that Canada has one of the world's largest supplies of natural resources such as oil, metals, and lumber. It also has a sparse population spread over a vast landscape. Canada has thus faced acute labour shortages and has responded by actively searching for immigrants. In the late 19th century this included bringing Chinese migrants to build the Canadian Pacific Railway and actively advertising in Europe to find farmers with the Last Best West campaign. Today similar recruitment efforts are needed to staff the oil sands projects in Alberta.

Another factor that contributes to the immigration question is Canada's low birth rate (10.3 births per 1000 people). The theory is that new residents can assist in meeting future government obligations relating to pay-as-you-go liabilities.

The economic dangers of population decline are not universally accepted. Organizations like the Fraser Institute question whether a declining population would reduce or increase per capita income, noting that in the short term, with a stable economy, fewer people would increase the per capita income simply because you divide the income among fewer people. This would increase per head consumption and create a climate of economic wellbeing that could nurture pro-family values and policies which can increase Canada's birth rate. A study by the C. D. Howe Institute suggests that immigration cannot keep Canada's population young and could possibly contribute to population ageing in the near term. Employment statistics have also brought into question whether skilled worker immigrants, with a 34% unemployment rate in 2001, are successfully meeting existing labour market needs in Canada. However, data from the 2020 Labor Force Survey has shown a 9.5% unemployment rate among landed immigrants. Many developed nations have much lower fertility rates than Canada but have not embraced immigration.

The first detailed analysis of Canadian immigration policy came from the Economic Council of Canada; it called for immigration to be increased to eventually bring Canada's population to 100 million. While it found that the economic benefits to Canada of immigration were fairly small, noting that "a historical perspective gives little or no support to the view that immigration is needed for national prosperity," it also concluded that the benefits to the newcomers themselves were extremely large. The report concluded that "it would be hard not to recommend an increase when immigrants can gain so much and Canadians not only do not lose but actually make slight economic gains." Economists later conducted a series of studies using large amounts of census data (844,476 individuals) and found out that immigrants who arrived from 1987 to 2004 paid only 57% of the taxes paid by average Canadian in 2006, with the effect that taxes from immigrants do not exceed the government expenses relating to them (a gap of $23 billion annually according to their numbers).

Racialization and its Economic Impact
Recent immigrants are far more likely than native born Canadians to initially have low incomes due to differences in culture, difficulties due to English as their second language, discrimination, and racialization. The employment equity policy prescriptions are not translated into programs that help immigrants to participate in the economy on equal footing with other Canadians against the hostile labor market. There are no governmental incentive programs that would encourage organizations for hiring educationally qualified immigrants to positions they are fit for work but lack aspects a native-born Canadian initially would have for the workplace. A 2006 Canadian government report shows that 22 percent of racialized persons lived in poverty compared to 9 percent of non-racialized persons and in major cities more than half of the people living in poverty were those who were racialized and the comparative poverty rate was exponentially growing, and later in a 2019 study it was found that the rate of poverty amongst recent immigrants is 2.4 times higher than that of native-born Canadians and identified it to be a  ever-widening trend. In certain cities there are active local immigration partnerships that aid immigrants in getting jobs, however a network of community based wraparound services through existing community organization's are not available. A 2001 study found successful interpellation is possible if young people are considered for immigration, the study found a positive correlation between age and earnings for immigrants with acculturation effect, and the study observed it in immigrants who were visible minorities or whose mother tongue was not English. A 2003 study found that with then job accessibility for immigrants it would take more than 20 years of Canadian experience to achieve any positive economic gains.

Immigrant wellbeing

Education levels
The Canadian system puts great emphasis on finding skilled immigrants. Immigrants to Canada are more skilled than immigrants to the United States. George J. Borjas compared immigrants to Canada and the United States finding those to Canada being better educated and receiving higher wages once settled. He accredits this to Canadian neoliberal economy.

Within the Canadian economy, immigrants are mostly found at the highest education levels. In Canada, 38% of male workers with a post-graduate degree are immigrants to the country, and while 23% of Canadians are foreign born, they comprise 49% of doctorate holders. A persistent problem for skilled immigrants is the recognition of foreign credentials. Data from Statistics Canada reports that only 72.2% of new immigrants (landed within 5 years) between the ages of 25 and 54 that possess a university degree are employed. While Canada recruits people to come based on their degrees, many newcomers arrive to find employers and professional organizations not recognizing their foreign education. As the percentage of skilled newcomers as a share of total migrants has increased, so has this problem. A study done by the IZA Journal of Development and Migration, found that between 1991 and 2006, Canadian-educated immigrants and Foreign-educated immigrants, found that Canadian-educated immigrants who graduated from university had a large earnings gap with their Canadian-born counterparts both in the initial years after immigration and in the long run. It was speculated that this outcome was likely due to lack of Canadian work experience and deficiencies in their social networks and language abilities.

The setting of standards for, or recognition of, almost all professional credentials does not fall within the federal government's control and are therefore not determined by either federal laws or Citizenship and Immigration Canada policies, but Citizenship and Immigration Canada established the Foreign Credentials Referral Office to provide something like a directory assistance service for immigrants. The Government of Ontario enacted the Fair Access to Regulated Professions Act, 2006 to help immigrants qualify for 34 provincially regulated professions. The Act also established the position of Fairness Commissioner in the province. In 2007, the Government of Alberta signed an agreement with federal government that will accelerate the process of foreign credential recognition for new immigrants by licensing bodies in that province. Other provinces have made similar commitments.

Decline in economic well-being
Over the last 25 years the economic position of newcomers to Canada relative to the native population has steadily declined. A number of hypotheses have been advanced to explain these issues.
 The selection process is flawed;
 Government and corporate policies deliberately shift immigrants to secondary sector occupations. These are jobs characterized by high instability, hazardous work environments, and low pay. Inherently those involved in these sectors will have lower wages and more periods of unemployment. In several European countries the immigration system is almost fully designed to try to fill these positions. This is less the case in Canada, but significant recruitment programs for sectors such as agriculture and oil and gas recruit many workers to perilous jobs.
 Newer immigrants from outside of Europe are victims of racial discrimination.
 Canada's social programs create incentives that conflict with the employment objective; and/or
 Increased job competition among even native-born Canadians has increased the importance of relying on networking to access the "hidden market," putting immigrants at a disadvantage given their lack of deep and broad networks.<ref
name=CTV></ref>

A January 2007 study by Statistics Canada analyzed the drop in income of economic immigrants from several perspectives. Economic immigrants are now more likely to begin their stay in Canada with a "low-income" (less than 50% of the median income) than an immigrant in any of the other immigration classes (see Table 16 in the study). This drop occurred during the 1990s and early 2000s despite the percentage of immigrants arriving with degrees in the economic class (including principal applicants, spouses, and dependents) rising from 29% in 1992 to 56% in 2003.

Stating an intention to reduce a backlog of immigration applicants of all classes, and to better target the required skills needed in Canada, the federal government passed a law in 2008 that gave the immigration minister new powers to alter immigrant selection.  Many expected that these powers would be used to favour workers in skilled trades over immigrants selected on the basis of education through the points system.

While the well-being of immigrants has declined in recent years, this has not affected second generation immigrants, or those who came to Canada as a child. This group is one of the most successful in Canada, with education and earning levels well above that of their parents and also above the Canadian average.

COVID-19
In 2020, the Canadian government has planned to support economic recovery through increased immigration adding further strain to the socioeconomic system  while other countries like New Zealand have a different COVID-19 recovery immigration strategy. The official Canadian government website quotes "Immigrants contribute to our economy, not only by filling gaps in our labour force and paying taxes, but also by spending money on goods, housing and transportation." However, the same is true with citizens and other capitalistic countries also use young and changing temporary foreign workforce for achieving it's economic needs and driving down wages. In spite of it, the Canadian liberal populism vehemently rejects the notion of needing modern slaves and intends to promote temporary workforce into permanent residents while lamenting the need of workforce in categories where majority of temporary workforce are employed. As a part of aggressively achieving Century Initiatives goal, some never-before-seen immigration changes were made in 2021 to expand pathways to permanent residency for international students and temporary foreign workers by lowering scores, considering passing of an academic program, removing English and French language proficiency test results requirement, and by removing work experience requirement, this solidified the notion that getting a study permit is an unofficially recognized pathway for getting Canadian residency, some considered this to as cracks in the immigration system, as a  backdoor to residency, and others as a convoluted pathway for migrant justice. More such changes were underway in 2022.
However, these changes and promotions were heavily critiqued, stating it would increase worker mobility from low-wage sectors to sectors with better pay and the temporary workforce in odious sectors will be unwilling to work in low wages and unappealing working conditions as Canadian workforce are (and it was evident from the 74% increase in job vacancies in the sector after the first TR to PR scheme) or it could change employer behaviors and the currently suffering category without temporary workforce will even suffer more. From grassroot level investigation's in the refugees category it was found out that most refugees are ending up "on the street" and critiques recommend that Canada should not accept more refugees without proper systems that can ensure their welfare. Pedro Antunes, Chief Economist at Conference Board of Canada, based on forecasts stated that "Immigration continues to be an important driver of Canada’s social and economic well-being, especially as we recover from the COVID-19 pandemic." As a part of this liberal vision in 2022 the government lifted off 20 hours work limit for international students and gave employers more supply of labour at an external cost (negative) for majority of the resident population. Another government impact assessment states that "high immigration levels have been recognized by the Bank of Canada as net benefit for the economy, driving labour force growth, consumption and housing activity." This is when Canada is facing heightened housing crisis and looming questions like whether low skilled workers should be integrated completely or could they be brought in seasonally like many other countries do are present. Focussing on immigration as a solution towards generating tax revenue and filling up unwanted jobs is considered to be flogging a dead horse due to lack of innovation, lack of infrastructure for training required citizen workforce, lack of inclusivity for training resident population through subsidies, bottlenecking of admissions to in-need and emerging professional programs, adversely the population effect that increased immigration levels affect negatively on the per capita public transfer to a citizen, the withheld taxes from actual income due to not engaging in formal economy, regulatory bindings that force immigrant workforce into complementary job statuses and resulting waste of human capital, underemployment and mismatched jobs (horizontal and vertical), etc. Another study states that in 2019-2020 about $785M (outside Quebec) were funded to more than 500 third-party settlement service provider organizations across Canada. However, list of these third party settlement providers, their active status, and their service achievements are not available for public access. They state the increased immigration could increase investment and improvements in labour market integration process of immigrants itself like addressing underemployment, language training (while the immigration program already has a standardized test result submission to qualify for immigration), and improving foreign credential recognition (which already exists and is a part of the immigration application). In 2023, Canada intended to increase immigration levels that will account for 1.08% of Canada’s population while cities were struggling with lack of infrastructure to hold current temporary residents, new permanent residents, and new citizens.

Long-term outcomes
One of the most important studies of the economic impact of immigration to Canada is Morton Beiser's Strangers at the Gate. This study looked at the arrival of the Vietnamese boat people who began to arrive in Canada in 1979 to much controversy. The total number of refugees was 60,000, the largest single group of refugees to ever arrive in Canada. Beiser first studied the boat people upon their arrival, finding that few spoke English or French, that most were farmers with few skills useful in Canada, and that they had arrived with no assets with which to establish themselves. Beiser then followed the progress of the boat people to see what effect they would have on Canada. Within ten years of arrival the boat people had an unemployment rate 2.3% lower than the Canadian average. One in five had started a business, 99% had successfully applied to become Canadian citizens, and they were considerably less likely than average to receive some form of social assistance.

Immigrant employment and income

Employment
Unemployment tends to be very high for recent immigrants, compared to more established immigrants (lived in Canada between 5 and 10 years). Established immigrants tend to have an unemployment rate closer to the national unemployment rate of native-born citizens. In 2011, the unemployment rate of recently arrived immigrants was 13.6%, considerably above the native Canadian average of 5.5%. For more established immigrants, the rate fell to 8.2%

Income
Higher rates of unemployment and lower wages combine to give newcomers less income than the Canadian average. An analysis of Longitudinal Immigration Database by Statistics Canada showed that immigrants who landed in 2014, had a median income of $24,000 in 2015, compared to an income of $36,000 for native-born Canadians. The median income for new immigrants in 2015 was the highest ever recorded and $2,000 more than the median income of new immigrants in 2013. In previous decades, immigrant income levels did rise to the national average after 10 years, but in recent years the situation has deteriorated. A 2003 study published by Statistics Canada noted that "in 1980 recent immigrants had low-income rates 1.4 times that of Canadian born, by 2000 they were 2.5 times higher, at 35.8%." The study noted that the deterioration was widespread and affected most types of immigrants. The 2003 study explains that the low-income rate among non-immigrants declined in the 1990s, but this was more than offset by the income profile of new immigrants, resulting in a net rise in Canada's total low-income rate.  An updated January 2007 study by Statistics Canada, explains that the deterioration continued into the next decade, with the low-income rate of recent immigrants reaching rates of 3.5 times that of Canadian born in 2002 and 2003, before edging back to 3.2 times in 2004. The 2007 study explains that this deterioration has occurred even though Canada implemented changes in 1993 to encourage more highly educated immigrants, with 45% of new immigrants having university degrees as of 2004.

In 1991, the Economic Council of Canada found that periods of immigration were not directly linked to periods of high growth. They noted that "a historical perspective gives little or no support to the view that immigration is needed for economic prosperity. In the 19th and early 20th centuries, the fastest growth in per capita real incomes occurred at times when net immigration was nil or negative. Later in the 20th century, the opposite linkage is seen but, clearly, there is no long-term correlation." However, the same report found that a high rate of immigration was good for Canada's future, and recommended expanding immigration rates to bring Canada's population to 100 million. A University of Montreal study published in 2002 by professor Marc Termote used different methods and studied different countries and concluded that immigration has no statistically significant impact to the per capita income of a country.

Wages
In terms of the impact of immigration worldwide, Statistics Canada estimates that for every 10% increase in the population from immigration, wages in Canada are now reduced by 4% on average (with the greatest impact to more skilled workers, such as workers with post-graduate degrees whose wages are reduced by 7%).

In part because of the credential issue, many immigrants are forced to find work below their education level and at lower wages. However, even for doing work of the same skill level, immigrants are much less well compensated than their native born counterparts. Immigration scholar Jeffrey Reitz calculated that in 2001 native Canadian employers were benefiting from, and immigrant employees were losing out on, between $2 and 3 billion per year due to this imbalance. A study published by Statistics Canada reviewed data from 1991 to 2010 regarding the convergence of wages between immigrants and native-born Canadians. The study found that there was a convergence of relative earnings for immigrants. Immigrant men's average annual wages were 86% of those of native-born men in 2010, up from 76% in 1991.

There are a number of possible explanations for why newcomers earn less than native Canadians in the same jobs with the same skills. Lower hourly wages might be an indication that the labour productivity of immigrants is lower, and employers thus have reason to pay them less. New workers are also less familiar with the Canadian labour market and will thus not be able to maximize their salaries. Employers will also be less familiar with an immigrant's background and thus less willing to offer the same salary as to a native. Due to lower mobility, they do not access better paying jobs, such as in Alberta and Saskatchewan. This has been changing with Calgary already surpassing Montreal in terms of percentage of visible minorities. Visible minorities in Saskatchewan earn higher wages than native-born Canadians.

Wider effects

Government and social assistance
The government has a large department and a number of programs to try to ensure the well-being of immigrants to Canada, and ameliorate their economic condition. Immigration, Refugees and Citizenship Canada (IRCC) employs 5,000 staff, which on a per capita basis is 3 times more than the 15,000 U.S. Citizenship and Immigration Services employees. IRCC recoups some of its department costs through landing fees.  In 2006, the Canadian government reduced the landing fee per immigrant by 50%. The Parliamentary Budget Officer has reported that irregular migration, from the initial entry into Canada to the final decision from the Immigration and Refugee Board and/or Federal Court, as well as any deportations, cost the federal government $340 million in 2017–18, and is projected to rise to $396 million in 2019–20.

New immigrants are also entitled to settlement assistance such as free language training under provincial government administered programs usually called Language Instruction for Newcomers to Canada (LINC), for which the federal government budgeted about $350 million to give to the provinces for the fiscal year 2006–2007. The majority of the $350 million was allocated to Quebec under the Canada-Quebec Accord, at $196 million per year, even though immigration to Quebec represented only 16.5% of all immigration to Canada in 2005. The $350 million is budgeted to increase by an additional $90 million by 2009. Provincial governments in Canada have established citizenship and immigration departments, such as Ontario's Ministry of Citizenship, Immigration and International Trade.

Support for immigrants was also one of the key issues that formed the basis of the New Deal for Cities between Toronto (and other urban centres), the Government of Ontario, and the Government of Canada, because 43% of new immigrants settle in the Greater Toronto Area resulting in certain challenges for that region. A paper published by Statistics Canada noted that "Over the 1990s (1990 to 2000) the city's low-income rate rose 1.9 percentage points. All of this increase was associated with deteriorating outcomes among immigrants, which tended to increase the city's low-income rate by 2.8 percentage points." In other words, the low-income rate among non-immigrants fell, but the income profile of new immigrants resulted in a net widening of the income inequality gap in Toronto during the 1990s.

The needs of immigrants prompted the United Way of Greater Toronto, the largest United Way charity in Canada, to identify immigration services in Toronto as a top priority for their $100 million 2006 campaign to combat poverty and social exclusion. In 2006, the Daily Bread Food Bank in Toronto reported that over 40% of its clients are foreign-born, and that almost half of that group had been in the country for less than 4 years. While the less than 4-year group shows far above average need, the over 40% figure is in line with the general population as 44% of Torontonians are foreign-born.

Government finances
There is no consensus on the net impact of immigration to government finances. A 1990 study found that an average immigrant household paid $22,528 in all forms of taxes and on average each household directly consumed $10,558 in government services. By contrast an average native Canadian household paid $20,259 in tax and consumed $10,102 dollars in services. Across the country this means that immigrant households contributed $2.6 billion more than their share to the public purse. A 1996 study found that over a lifetime a typical immigrant family will pay some forty thousand dollars more to the treasury than they will consume in services. Explanations for this include that immigrant households tend to be larger, and have more wage earners, increasing taxes. Newcomers are also less likely to make use of many social services. Immigrants are less likely than native Canadians to receive employment insurance, social assistance, and subsidized housing. Immigrants are also much less likely to become homeless or suffer from mental illness. Recent immigrants are also less likely to make use of subsidized housing than native Canadians of the same income level. In 2004 22.5% of low-income native Canadians lived in subsidized housing, but only 20.4% of low income recent immigrants did so, though this number was considerably higher among more established immigrants. Results from a study from the Fraser Institute found that the immigrants who arrived between 1987 and 2004 cost governments $23 billion per annum (as of 2006) in excess of taxes raised from those immigrants, relating to universal social services (e.g., welfare, medicare, public education).

International trade
Organizations that facilitate Canada's international trade system include the Department of Foreign Affairs, Trade and Development (publicly known as Global Affairs Canada); the Trade Controls Bureau, which operates under the Minister of Foreign Affairs; the Canada Border Services Agency (CBSA); and the Canadian International Trade Tribunal, which is an independent quasi-judicial body.

The presence within Canada of people representative of many different cultures and nations has also been an important boost to Canada's international trade. Immigrants will often have the expertise, linguistic skills, personal connections with their country of origin that can help forge international trade ties. Studies have found that Canada does have greater trade relations with those nations that have provided large numbers of immigrants. Canada's economy is heavily centered on international trade, which accounted for 31.4% of GDP in 2017. As of 2017, 76.4% of Canadian exports go to the United States.

This has been good for the source countries of immigrants to Canada. For many years, expanded markets for trade has been a common rationale and justification for high immigration from the developing world. Data from Statistics Canada in 2017 reveals that the trade balances with developing countries from which Canada receives most of its immigrants ameliorates. As shown below, data from 2017 shows that only India has balanced trade with Canada.

See also

 Demographics of Canada
 Ethnic groups in Canada
 History of immigration to Canada
 Canada immigration statistics
 Economy of Canada
 Economic results of migration

References

Notes

Citations

Further reading

 Myers, Gustavus (1972), A history of Canadian wealth, Lewis and Samue

Immigration to Canada
Economy of Canada
Canada